Martha Burns (born 23 April 1957) is a Canadian actress known for her stage work and youth outreach in Ontario and her leading role as Ellen Fanshaw in the TV dramedy series Slings and Arrows.

Early life
Burns was born and raised in Winnipeg, Manitoba, Canada. She studied at the University of Alberta and the Vancouver Playhouse's Acting School.

Career
Burns has had a long career as a character and supporting actress. Her most notable television roles being Shakespearean diva Ellen Fanshaw in Slings and Arrows, for which she won two Gemini Awards, Jasmina Hart on Michael, Tuesdays and Thursdays and Rebecca Baker on Remedy.

Some of her notable film work includes Long Day's Journey into Night and for Love and Savagery, both resulting in Genie Awards for Best Performance by an Actress in a Supporting Role.

Theatre
Burns is a founding member and a former associate director of Toronto's Soulpepper Theatre Company., Burns headed up Soulpepper's extensive youth outreach program. She founded the Toronto Arts for Youth Award, and has worked as an instructor for the theatre program at George Brown College.

She has performed leading roles at Stratford, the Shaw Festival, the National Arts Centre and The Company Theatre. She was nominated five times for a Dora Award and won twice: in 1986 for The Miracle Worker and in 1984 for Trafford Tanzi.

In 2005 she was honoured for her career in the theatre with the Barbara Hamilton Award.

In 2016 Burns was awarded ACTRA’s Leslie Yeo Award, an award honouring actors for their volunteer work. She donated her cash prize to the Qaggiq Performing Arts Teacher Training Workshop, a program that works on developing Inuit-specific performing arts programming for children and youth.

Personal life
Burns is married to director and actor Paul Gross. They have two children, Hannah Gross and Jack.

Filmography

Film

Television

References

External links
 

Living people
Canadian film actresses
Canadian stage actresses
Canadian television actresses
Dora Mavor Moore Award winners
Best Supporting Actress Genie and Canadian Screen Award winners
1958 births
Actresses from Winnipeg
20th-century Canadian actresses
21st-century Canadian actresses
Academic staff of George Brown College
Academic staff of Toronto Metropolitan University
Best Actress in a Drama Series Canadian Screen Award winners